Oppol is a 1981 Malayalam-language drama film, produced by Rosamma George under the banner of JMJ Arts, directed by K. S. Sethumadhavan and written by M. T. Vasudevan Nair. The film stars Balan K. Nair, Menaka and Master Aravind in the lead roles. The film features original songs composed by M. B. Sreenivasan. The film was based on a short story of the same name written by M. T. Vasudevan Nair in 1975. The film revolves around Malu and her brother Appu. Malu gets married to Govindan and shifts to his house along with her brother. Appu however, gets jealous of Govindan when he starts thinking that he will isolate him from his sister. The rest of the film deals with how they mend their relationship.

The film was released in theaters on 2 April 1981 to critical acclaim. The film was also a major commercial success and went on to become the second highest grossing Malayalam film of the year behind Kolilakkam. The film won three National Awards for Best Actor  (Balan K. Nair), Best Child Artist (Master Aravind) and Best Female Playback Singer (S. Janaki). The film also won two State Awards for Best Film and Best Director (K. S. Sethumadhavan). The film is now considered a classic in Malayalam cinema and it also marked the official debut of veteran actress, Menaka G. Suresh (the mother of actress, Keerthy Suresh and the wife of Malayali producer, G. Suresh Kumar who made a future mark in further Mollywood industry until her marriage in the late-80s)

Plot
The film revolves around Malu, her younger brother Appu (Aravind) and Malu's husband Govindan. Malu and 6-year old Appu were living together. When Malu is married to Govindan, an ex-military officer, she takes Appu with her to Govindan's house. Govindan is a bit annoyed, but adjusts to the situation to win over his wife, who is much younger than him. Appu, on the other hand, becomes jealous of Govindan and worries he will isolate him from his dear sister. He attacks Govindan during honeymoon and Malu scolds him. The boy runs away from the house and Malu becomes distressed. Towards the end it is revealed that Appu is actually the son of Malu. When Govindan discovers the truth, he tirelessly searches for the boy and brings him back.

Short story
The Little Magazine, A children's magazine adapted the film into a short story.

Cast
 Balan K. Nair as Govindhan Kutty
 Menaka as Malu / Malooty / Oppol 
 Master Aravind/M. P. Ramnath as Appu / T Rajasekharan
 Kaviyoor Ponnamma as Narayani amma / Appu's Vallyamama
 Jose Prakash as Narayani's brother
 Sankaradi as Kunjan Nair

Soundtrack
The music was composed by M. B. Sreenivasan with lyrics by P. Bhaskaran.

Reception

Critical Reception 
Upon release the film received excellent reviews. In a retrospect review Neelima Menon of The News Minute goes on to say that the film is K. S. Sethumadhavan's most prolific and underrated work. She also states that the film was bold at the time for discussing a variety of issues that women face in society, like the stigma around a woman who loses her chastity before marriage. She also goes on to appreciate Balan K. Nair's performance in the film and praises its screenplay for its boldness to tackle issues that woman face in society.

Box Office 
For the first week response was lukewarm however, through positive reviews and word of mouth, the film went on to become a commercial success. The film completed a 100 day run in several centers. The film was the second highest grossing film of the year behind Kolilakkam.

Accolades
 National Film Award for Best Actor for Balan K. Nair
 National Film Award for Best Child Artist for Aravind 
 National Film Award for Best Female Playback Singer for S. Janaki (song: "Ettumanoor Ambalathile") 
 Kerala State Film Award for Best Film
 Kerala State Film Award for Best Director for K. S. Sethumadhavan.

References

External links

 English translation of the short story "Oppol" Part 1
 English translation of the short story "Oppol" Part 2

1980 films
1980 drama films
Films scored by M. B. Sreenivasan
1980s Malayalam-language films
Films featuring a Best Actor National Award-winning performance
Films with screenplays by M. T. Vasudevan Nair
Films directed by K. S. Sethumadhavan
Second Best Feature Film National Film Award winners
1981 drama films
1981 films